Jerzy Stroba (1919–1999) was a Polish Roman Catholic bishop.
 
He was born on 17 December 1919 in świętochłowice, Poland.
He became Auxiliary Bishop of Ggorzowski from 1958 to 1972, Bishop of Szczecin–Kamień in 1972–1978, Archbishop of Poznań from 1978 to 1999.

He  died on 12 May 1999 in Poznań.

References

Bishops of Poznań
20th-century Roman Catholic archbishops in Poland
1919 births
1999 deaths
Clergy from Szczecin